Hyderabad Hotshots was a badminton franchise team representing the city of Hyderabad in the Indian Badminton League(IBL). The team was one of the six franchises in the inaugural IBL 2013. The franchise was owned by Andhra Pradesh’s multi business group PVP Ventures. The primary home ground of Hyderabad Hotshots was Gachibowli Indoor Stadium in Hyderabad. Hyderabad Hotshots was captained by Indian shuttler Saina Nehwal and coached by Rajendra.

Franchise history
Badminton Association of India(BAI) announced a franchise league known as "Indian Badminton League" with six franchises representing six Indian cities. PVP Ventures chairman, Prasad V Potluri, was the first to bid for Hyderabad Hotshots and also to own one of the first franchises announced by IBL. The first season player auctions were held on 22 July 2013. Player auctions were held in Delhi and the Hyderabad Hotshots bid of $120,000 for player Saina Nehwal was successful. Nehwal was the highest paid female shuttler and second highest paid shuttler overall in the tournament behind World No. 1 Lee Chong Wei of Malaysia with a bid of $135,000 by Mumbai Masters.

The franchise has been terminated and got replaced by Hyderabad Hunters in 2016 PBL.

Squad

Indian Players
  Saina Nehwal (WS)
  Shubhankar Dey (MD)
  Tarun Kona (XD)
  Ajay Jayaram (MS)
  Kanthi Visalakshi (WS)
  Pradnya Gadre (XD)
  Rahul C Yadav (MD)

Foreign players
  Taufik Hidayat (MS)
  Tanongsak Saensomboonsuk (MS)
  Goh V Shem (MD)
  Lim Khim Wah (MD)

Support Staff
 Jakkampudi Rajendra Kumar (Coach)
 Anil Kumar N (Asst. Coach)
 Kiran C (Physio)
 P V Sarada (Team Manager)

2013 Season statistics

Semi-final
Hyderabad Hotshots qualified for semi-final after scoring 17 points from the league matches. The semi-final was held at their home ground Gachibowli Indoor Stadium in Hyderabad on 28 August 2013. Hyderabad Hotshots faced Pune Pistons in the semi-final.

 Ajay Jayram (HH) beat Tien Minh Nguyen (PP) by 21–17, 21–11.
 Saina Nehawal (HH) beat Schenk Juliane (PP) by 21–10, 19–21, 11–8.
 Goh V Shem & Wah Lim Khim (HH) beat Fischer Nielsen Joachim & Sanave Thomas (PP) by 16–21, 21–14, 11–7

Final
Hyderabad Hotshots qualified for final after defeating Pune Pistons in semi-finals. The final was held at National Sports Club of India, Mumbai on 31 August 2013. Hyderabad Hotshots faced Awadhe Warriors in the final.

 K Srikanth (AW) beat S Tanongsak (HH) by 21–12, 21–20.
 Saina Nehwal (HH) beat P V Sindhu (AW) by 21–15, 21–7.
 Goh V Shem & Wah Lim Khim (HH) beat Markis Kido & Mathias Boe (AW) by 21–14, 13–21, 11–4.
 Ajay Jayaram (HH) beat R M V Guru Sai Dutt (AW) by 10–21, 21–17, 11–7.

References

Premier Badminton League teams
Sport in Hyderabad, India